Hershel Parker is an American professor of English and literature, noted for his research into the works of Herman Melville. Parker is the H. Fletcher Brown Professor Emeritus at the University of Delaware. He is co-editor with Harrison Hayford of the Norton Critical Edition of Herman Melville's Moby-Dick (1967, 2001, and 2017), and the General Editor of the Northwestern-Newberry Edition of The Writings of Herman Melville, which, with the publication of volume 13, "Billy Budd, Sailor" and Other Uncompleted Writings, is now (2017) complete in fifteen volumes. Parker is the author of a two-volume biography of Herman Melville published by Johns Hopkins University Press (1996, 2002). Parker also edited the first ever one-volume edition of Melville's complete poetry, Herman Melville: Complete Poems, published by the Library of America in 2019.  

Parker is an advocate of traditional methods of literary research, which emphasize access to original materials, encourage deliberate study of chronology, and examine the relationship between a literary work and the creative genius of its author. He has spoken out against academic schools of thought such as New Criticism, post structuralism and semiotics which ignore or downplay scholarly analysis of authorial intention.

Parker’s work on Ornery People: Who Were the Depression Okies?, a family study in relation to the history of the American South, has led to his becoming a regular contributor to the webzine Journal of the American Revolution.

Melville biography

Volume 1 of Parker's two-volume biography, Herman Melville: A Biography, Vol. 1,1819-1851, Vol.2, 1851-1891, was one of two finalists for the 1997 Pulitzer Prize in Biography. Both volumes in turn won the highest award from the Association of American Publishers, the first volume in the category of “Literature and Language” (1997) and the second in a new category of “Biography and Autobiography” (2003). On September 22, 2008 at the inaugural public program of the CUNY Leon Levy Center for Biography, "An Eloquent Beginning", one of the presenters, Pulitzer Prize winner John Matteson, read aloud the first paragraph of Herman Melville: A Biography, 1819-1851, as an example of how “the opening paragraph should reflect the character of the subject, the way the music of a great aria fits the mood of the words being sung".

In 2013 Parker published Melville Biography: An Inside Narrative, a companion volume to the two-volume biography that is, in part, a memoir of the decades of collaborative research that established a documentary, archival foundation for the two-volume biography. In Melville Biography, Parker also looks at the various theoretical approaches to editing, biography, and literary criticism widely practiced in recent decades — including Marxist Theory, The New Criticism, The New Historicism, Post-Structuralism, and Deconstruction — that he believes fostered the ahistorical, antiarchival biases that likely led some critics and reviewers to publish negative critiques of the two-volume biography. The book was singled out in The New Yorker Blog as a book to "watch out for". Melville Biography: An Inside Narrative was critically acclaimed by the respected biographer, Carl Rollyson, in his Wall Street Journal review, "The Hunt for Herman Melville".

Editorial Projects: Herman Melville 
He has undertaken five long-term collaborative projects. He was Associate General Editor of the Northwestern-Newberry Edition of The Writings of Herman Melville for 13 volumes and is General Editor for the final two volumes, Published Poems (2009) and “Billy Budd, Sailor” and Other Uncompleted Writings (2017). He edited the 1820-1865 section of The Norton Anthology of American Literature (1979 and the next four editions); much of his work remains in the sixth edition (2007), according to Norton policy. For each of the four volumes of the edition of Melville in the Bibliothèque de la Pléiade, edited by Philippe Jaworski (1997–2010), he contributed a “Chronologie". Since 1986 he has been expanding Jay Leyda’s chronological documentary life, The Melville Log, from 1000 pages in the 1969 edition to 9000 pages. Parker has in preparation a three-volume selection to be published by the Gordian Press with Robert A. Sandberg collaborating as design and layout editor. In addition, Parker has written articles and books in collaboration with other scholars, most frequently with Brian Higgins, as in their Louisiana State University Press Reading Melville’s “Pierre; or,The Ambiguities” (2006).

Recovering Lost Authority in American Novels 
In the 1970s Parker pioneered the study of lost authority in standard American novels by Mark Twain, F. Scott Fitzgerald, William Faulkner, Norman Mailer and others. His work on Stephen Crane repeatedly evoked threats of lawsuits from Fredson Bowers for alleging  sloppiness in both theory and practice in Bowers' Virginia Edition of Crane's works. Parker’s 1984 Flawed Texts and Verbal Icons: Literary Authority in American Fiction was the first book systematically to bring biographical evidence to bear on textual theory, literary criticism, and literary theory. Frequently attacked by reviewers trained in the New Criticism as well as by proponents of the New Bibliography of W. W. Greg and Fredson Bowers, Flawed Texts and Verbal Icons nevertheless has been applied to their problems by biblical, classical, and medieval scholars as well as by critics of more modern literature. See for example Sally Bushell, Text as Process, John Van Engen, Past and Future of Medieval Studies,  Alison M. Jack, Texts Reading Texts Sacred and Secular 2, Robert S. Kawashima, “Comparative Literature and Biblical Studies: The Case of Allusion", Tim William Machan, Textual Criticism and Middle English Texts, Michael J. Meyer, Literature and Music, James J. O’Hara, “Trying Not to Cheat: Responses to Inconsistencies in Roman Epic", and Peter L. Shillingsburg, Scholarly Editing in the Computer Age.

Selected bibliography
Parker, Hershel, ed. (2019), Herman Melville: Complete Poems, Library of America, 990 pp. (reviewed by Helen Vendler, The New York Review of Books, 5 December 2019, pp. 29, 32–34).

References

External links

Living people
Lamar University alumni
University of Delaware faculty
1935 births
American literary historians
American male non-fiction writers
Herman Melville